Monica Viola Westén-Rydén (born 15 March 1966) is a retired Swedish athlete who competed primarily in the 400 metres hurdles. She represented her country at the 1992 Summer Olympics, as well as two World Championships, in 1991 and 1993. She won the bronze medal at the 1990 European Championships. Earlier in her career she was a combined events specialist.

Her personal best in the event is 54.69 seconds set in Stockholm in 1990.

Competition record

References

1966 births
Living people
People from Huddinge Municipality
Swedish female hurdlers
Swedish female high jumpers
Swedish heptathletes
Olympic athletes of Sweden
Athletes (track and field) at the 1992 Summer Olympics
World Athletics Championships athletes for Sweden
European Athletics Championships medalists
Competitors at the 1986 Goodwill Games
Sportspeople from Stockholm County